This is a list of wars involving the Republic of Mali.

See also
 Military of Mali

 
Mali
Military history of Mali
Wars